is a Japanese former boxer. Watanabe, who fought only in Japan and South Korea, was one of the first World super flyweight champions, as the division was relatively new when he was crowned.

Biography
With a background in Shotokan Karate, he started his professional boxing career with a three-round knockout over Keiza Miyazaki. The fight was in Okayama, Watanabe's birthplace.  Two first-round knockout wins followed, one over Yukihiro Kawahira, and another over Noburu Iishi. There was an immediate rematch with Iishi, and, although the second time around Iishi gave him a tougher test, nevertheless, Watanabe still came out a winner, by a knockout in six.

Three more knockouts followed, two in the first round, including one over Koji Kobayashi, future WBC world Flyweight champion and brother of former world champion Royal Kobayashi. Then, Watanabe was taken the distance for the first time, against Jin-Hyun Chun in Nagoya, Watanabe winning a six-round decision.

After two more decision wins, Watanabe flew to South Korea, where he challenged the WBC world Jr. Bantamweight champion Chul-Ho Kim, losing in his first world title bid by a 15-round decision. Watanabe then returned to Japan and won his remaining four bouts for 1981 there, three by knockout.
One of the fighters he beat was Tito Abella, who by then had been ranked as the number one Jr. Bantamweight challenger in the world. Abella was knocked out in four rounds.

In April 1982, the WBA Jr. Bantamweight champion of the world, Rafael Pedroza of Panama, the cousin of Eusebio Pedroza, travelled to Osaka to defend his belt against Watanabe on 8 April. Watanabe won a unanimous 15-round decision and became world champion. Watanabe's remaining fights of 1982 were title defenses against former world champions, Gustavo Ballas of Argentina, knocked out in nine rounds, and Shoji Oguma (former two time world Flyweight champion), beaten by a knockout in 12.

1983 was another busy year for the champion: He beat Luis Ibañez by a knockout in eight, Roberto Ramirez of Mexico by a decision in 15, and Soon-Chun Kwon by a technical decision in 11. Watanabe had built a considerable points lead over Kwon, but in round ten, their heads collided, causing a gap in Watanabe's head. He bled profusely, and the fight doctor ordered the fight to be stopped in round eleven, but since it was ruled that the cut was the product of a headbutt, the fight then went to the scorecards, and Watanabe was declared the winner.

In 1984, Watanabe disposed of another Venezuelan challenger, Celso Chavez, by knocking him out in 15 rounds. Then, he and WBC world champion Payao Poontarat met in an attempt to unify the world's Jr. Bantamweight title, and Watanabe finally earned the WBC's belt, winning by a 12-round decision. Although Watanabe didn't become undisputed as he was stripped of the WBA title for refusing to defend his title against his number 1 contender, Khaosai Galaxy. Watanabe also became the first lineal champion in the division.  There was an immediate rematch, and Watanabe again imposed his will, with an 11-round knockout over the former world champ.

In 1985, he retained the title with a 12-round decision over Julio Soto Solano. Wins over Katsuo Katsuma (KO 7) and Suk-Hwan Yun (KO 5) followed, but in 1986, he defended against the late Gilberto Roman in what would turn out to be his last fight. He lost to Roman by a 12-round decision and announced his retirement from professional boxing. Unlike so many others, he was able to stay away from the temptation of coming back and trying to regain his old popularity.

Watanabe's successor for the WBA title would be Galaxy.  Galaxy would win the vacant title against Eusebio Espinal and also go on to become a Jr. Bantamweight and reel off 19 straight title defenses before retiring.

In 1999, Watanabe was spotted at a Seoul activity honoring Asia's greatest boxing champions, alongside Fighting Harada, Jung-Koo Chang, Yoko Gushiken, Sot Chitalada, and former rivals Chul-Ho Kim and Poontarat, among others.

In August 1995, he was arrested for blackmail. He ran an import business in Osaka, and threatened the debtors by saying that he would beat them to death. Police suspended judgment on the matter, so he was released.

In October 1999, he was arrested for giving a gun to a friend who was prosecuted for murder. In July 2000, he was sentenced to 4 years and 6 months imprisonment.

After being released in 2004, he was arrested for blackmail along with Kenji Haga, ex-actor, and a yakuza of Yamaguchigumi, on 30 June 2007. He has denied the suspicion, but Japan Boxing Commission banished him on 27 July 2007.

Professional boxing record

See also
List of super-flyweight boxing champions
List of Japanese boxing world champions
Boxing in Japan

References

External links

 Jiro Watanabe – CBZ Profile

1955 births
Living people
Super-flyweight boxers
World super-flyweight boxing champions
World Boxing Association champions
World Boxing Council champions
Yakuza members
Japanese male boxers
Sportspeople from Okayama Prefecture